Peplow is a hamlet in Shropshire, England. It is part of the civil parish of Hodnet, a larger village to the north. The hamlets of Bowling Green and Radmoor are both in the village's vicinity.

It lies in a rural area on the A442 road, between Crudgington and Hodnet, with Ollerton immediately to the east.

At the time of the Domesday survey, the manor of Peplow was held by Ralph de Mortimer. The land later became part of the Hodnet estate, and was held by the Ludlow and Vernon families, until 1715 when it was sold to the Pigot family, who built Peplow Hall.

The hamlet is best known for Peplow Hall, an 18th-century manor house, and Peplow Mill. The mill contains an early water turbine dating from 1820 and spans the River Tern.

Peplow railway station was on the line from Wellington to Market Drayton operated by Great Western Railway. It opened in 1867 and closed in 1963.

There is a cricket club called Hodnet and Peplow CC, and the club's badge is that of a gold lion (from the gates of Hodnet Hall), lying beneath a green beech tree (representing the beech trees lining the driveway of Peplow Hall). Its first eleven play in the Rollinson Smith Shropshire Cricket League Division 3.

See also
Listed buildings in Hodnet, Shropshire

References

External links

Villages in Shropshire